Dancing Shoes is the third studio album by Swedish singer and September. It was released on 26 September 2007 on Catchy Tunes. The album was September's highest peaking album in Sweden at the time, peaking at #12 on the Swedish Album Chart. In Poland, the album peaked at #19. Dancing Shoes spawned two singles; "Can't Get Over" and "Until I Die", which both reached the top ten in Sweden. The album track "Because I Love You" was released as a promotional single for her compilation album Gold, and the single edit of "Cry for You was included as a bonus track on this album; it was previously released as single from her previous album In Orbit. Dancing Shoes was nominated for a Swedish Grammis Award in the category Dance/Hip Hop/Soul of the Year.

Track listing

Charts

Awards

References

2007 albums
Petra Marklund albums